Nigatsu-dō is one of the important structures of Tōdai-ji, a temple in Nara, Japan. Nigatsu-dō is located to the east of the Great Buddha Hall, on the hillside of Mount Wakakusa. It includes several other buildings in addition to the specific hall named Nigatsu-dō, thus comprising its own sub-complex within Tōdai-ji.

History 
Nigatsu-dō was founded by a monk by the name of Sanetada in 752, but the Buddhist monk Jitchu, a pupil of Rōben, later introduced a repentance service dedicated to the image of the eleven-faced Bodhisattva, Kannon in 760.  It has taken place as an annual rite since 760 without any break. The service has come to be known as Shuni-e, as it was held in the second month of the traditional lunisolar calendar.  At present, it starts on 1 March and ends on the 15th of the month. Omizutori, which means taking sacred water, has become the popular name of the ceremony.

While the first Shuni-e service is said to have been held by Jichu in another temple in 752, the original construction of Nigatsu-dō hall is estimated to have completed only somewhere between 756 and 772. Nigatsu-dō was destroyed in 1667 due to a fire.

 1667 (Kanbun 7): After fire destroyed the main temple structure, work on rebuilding  at Nara commenced.

Re-construction of Nigatsu-do is completed in 1669.  In 1944, it was chosen by Japan as one of the most important cultural aspects of the country.

Architecture 
Although the hall was saved from civil wars in 1180 and 1567 in which the Great Buddha Hall was lost, it was burnt down during the Shuni-e service of 1667. The hall was rebuilt two years later.

The current main hall of Nigatsu-dō is a designated National Treasure. The hall holds two Kannons, a large one and a small one, although both of them are classified as Hibutsu (秘仏) – "secret Buddhas" – and therefore are not publicly shown.

Additional Images

See also
 Omizutori, the climax of Shuni-e service which takes place on 12 March every year.
 For an explanation of terms concerning Japanese Buddhism, Japanese Buddhist art, and Japanese Buddhist temple architecture, see the Glossary of Japanese Buddhism.

Notes

References

Titsingh, Isaac. (1834). Annales des empereurs du Japon.  Paris: Oriental Translation Fund of Great Britain and Ireland. ; see also  Imprimerie Royale de France, 

World Heritage Sites in Japan
National Treasures of Japan
Buddhist temples in Nara Prefecture